Anoba polyspila is a species of moth found in Asia. It is sometimes placed in the genus Bessacta .

References

Anobinae